A fuel cell bus is a bus that uses a hydrogen fuel cell as its power source for electrically driven wheels, sometimes augmented in a hybrid fashion with batteries or a supercapacitor. The only emission from the bus is water. Several cities around the world have trialled and tested fuel cell buses, with over 5,600 buses in use worldwide, the majority of which are in China.

Background
Owing to the greenhouse gas emissions and particulate pollution produced by diesel buses, transport operators have been moving towards greener and cleaner buses (such as hybrid electric buses and battery electric buses) since the early 2000s. However, battery electric buses lack range compared to diesel buses, take time to charge and have reduced energy storage in cold weather.

Transport operators have therefore evaluated alternatives such as hydrogen fuel cell buses. Hydrogen fuel cells generate electricity by reacting hydrogen and oxygen in the presence of a catalyst, the by-product of which is water. This electricity is used as a power source for an electric motor, which drives the wheels of the bus. Some companies have proposed using the fuel cell as a range extender, combining it with a larger battery or a supercapacitor. Hydrogen has a higher energy density than lithium batteries, making it suitable for heavy vehicles such as buses and trucks.

The provenance of hydrogen fuel varies - with green hydrogen (produced using renewable electricity) being significantly more environmentally friendly than brown hydrogen (produced by burning coal or lignite) or grey hydrogen (produced by steam heating natural gas).

History

Initial tests and trials 
From the late 1980s, concern regarding diesel emissions from buses led to experimentation regarding the use of fuel cells to power vehicles. Initial proof of concept work involved demonstrating that fuel cells could be packaged into a bus, and successfully power one. Between 1994 and 1995, the Georgetown Fuel Cell Bus Program (led by Georgetown University and the United States Department of Energy) demonstrated three  buses powered by a phosphoric acid fuel cell from Fuji Electric. 
From the late 1990s, hydrogen-powered fuel-cell buses were trialled and experimented in a variety of cities. In 1998, Chicago and Vancouver began trials, using New Flyer Industries bus bodies and Ballard Power Systems hydrogen fuel cells.

From 2000, Hino and Toyota collaborated on the development of FCHV-BUS, a hydrogen fuel cell bus. After initial trials by Toei Bus in 2003, a fleet of 8 FCHV-BUS buses were then used at Expo 2005 in Aichi, Japan. During the Expo, they carried one million visitors and travelled about 130,000 kilometres. The buses were subsequently used as airport shuttle buses.

In the United States, the National Renewable Energy Laboratory (NERL) in the United States has been undertaking research work on hydrogen fuel cell buses since 2000, in collaboration with the Federal Transit Administration. AC Transit in the San Francisco Bay Area began trials of a hydrogen fuel cell bus in 2002.

Clean Urban Transport for Europe 
From 2001, the European Union supported research project Clean Urban Transport for Europe (CUTE) began running hydrogen fuel cell powered buses in nine European cities, including London, Madrid and Hamburg. The project was supported by a consortium of transportation operators, hydrogen infrastructure and fuel cell developers, universities and city authorities. Three other cities - Reykjavík, Beijing and Perth - took part in similar demonstration projects, supported by the same consortium. The Fuel Cell Bus Club became a forum to share experiences and information between cities and researchers.

All three projects used Mercedes-Benz Citaro buses, with hydrogen fuel cells from Ballard Power Systems. At the time they claimed to be the largest fleet of fuel cell buses in the world.

Completed in 2007, the projects were deemed a success by researchers. However, the buses were criticised by some operators for their high cost of operation, with Madrid reporting that they were around ten times as costly to fuel. Dedicated Hydrogen filling stations were also required to be built. The buses in Beijing - the first fuel cell buses in China - were withdrawn after one year, as air pollution reduced the efficiency and operating life of the fuel cells.

Further development 
In 2006, the Federal Transit Administration announced the National Fuel Cell Bus Technology Development Program. $49m in federal grants would be provided to transit agencies to help develop and test hydrogen fuel cell buses, to improve the potential commercialisation of them. In 2003, AC Transit introduced a Thor “ThunderPower” bus into trial service, with tests complete by October 2004. In 2006, five Van Hool buses powered by UTC Power fuel cells entered service. These were replaced in 2010 by other Van Hool hydrogen fuel cell buses. 

In 2009, BC Transit began operating fuel-cell buses in the town of Whistler in British Columbia, prior to the 2010 Winter Olympics. The fleet of 20 hydrogen fuel cell buses was the largest in the world at the time, with the project costing around $94m. Unlike previous projects, the hydrogen used was blue hydrogen, produced by Air Liquide in Quebec using hydroelectricity. Due to high operating costs, the program halted in 2015.

In 2010, eight hydrogen buses were introduced into service in London, with a substantially larger range than the fuel cell buses used in the mid 2000s. At the time, this was the largest hydrogen bus fleet in Europe. Transport for London acknowledged the high cost of the buses and the high cost in fuelling them, but noted that they "[expected] the costs to drop dramatically" as they become commercially viable.

In China, hydrogen fuel cell buses were used at Beijing 2008, Expo 2010 in Shanghai and the 2010 Asian Games in Guangzhou. These buses were developed by Higer Bus, with 3 deployed at Beijing 2008 and 196 at Expo 2010 in Shanghai.

The first Brazilian hydrogen fuel cell bus prototype began operation in São Paulo in 2009. The hydrogen bus was manufactured in Caxias do Sul. The programme, called "Ônibus Brasileiro a Hidrogênio" (Brazilian Hydrogen Autobus), includes three additional buses.

In March 2015, Europe's largest fleet of hydrogen fuel cell buses entered service in Aberdeen, Scotland. 10 Van Hool buses were used on a five year trial.

Large scale commercial introduction 

In 2015, Toyota began testing their updated hydrogen fuel cell bus in Tokyo, the Toyota FC Bus. Developed in conjunction with Hino Motors, it utilised technology from the Toyota Mirai hydrogen fuel cell car, as well as from Hino's hybrid buses. In 2017, Toyota unveiled the Toyota Sora bus, with production beginning in March 2018. By 2020, over 100 Toyota Sora buses had been delivered, operating on the Tokyo BRT, JR Bus Kanto and Toei Bus.

In 2018, Toyota announced that they would be supplying their hydrogen fuel cell technology to Portuguese bus manufacturer Caetano, for buses to be sold in Europe. The Caetano H2.City Gold has achieved numerous sales, such in Bielefeld, Cottbus, and Barcelona. Caetano has subsequently begun to brand the bus as a "Toyota", after Toyota became a majority shareholder.

In China, the Feichi (Allenbus) company began manufacturing hydrogen fuel cell buses in Yunfu after licensing the fuel cell technology from Ballard. The hydrogen fuel cell is combined with a 36kWh Lithium-ion battery, which powers the electric motors. Over 300 Feichi buses are now in service in the city of Foshan in Guangdong province in China. Other manufacturers in China also began to produce hydrogen fuel cell buses. Zhongtong Bus began a research and development programme in 2014, and began producing buses in 2016.

In 2018, Zhangjiakou ordered 74 hydrogen fuel cell buses in preparation for the Beijing 2022 Winter Olympics. During the Games, over 800 hydrogen fuel cell buses and coaches were used from manufacturers Foton, Yutong, Geely and Zhongtong Bus. Hydrogen fuel cell vehicles were chosen over battery electric vehicles due to the cold weather prevalent in Hebei Province. The substantial use of hydrogen was criticised, given that much of China's hydrogen is "black hydrogen", produced by burning coal. This meant that each kilo of hydrogen produced around 15–20 kg of CO2. 

Launched in 2017, the Hyundai  entered commercial service in South Korea in December 2019. By June 2021, 108 buses were in service across South Korea. Trial operations of the ElecCity with Wiener Linien in Vienna, Austria were planned from November 2021, with further tests in Germany also announced. The cities of Busan and Ulsan announced in 2022 that they planned to introduce over 620 buses by 2025.

In 2019, Polish bus manufacturer Solaris Bus & Coach announced a hydrogen fuel cell bus on their popular Urbino 12 platform. This was subsequently tested by a range of major operators including RATP in Paris, and ordered by European bus operators including Connexxion, ÖBB Postbus, and MPK Poznań. In 2022, Solaris announced a hydrogen fuel cell version of their Urbino 18 articulated bus at InnoTrans 2022.

In 2020, the city of Nanning in China announced they planned to replace their entire 7,000 battery electric bus fleet with better performing hydrogen fuel cell/battery hybrid buses.

, the NERL was continuing work to evaluate fuel cell bus projects in the U.S, with 64 buses in service in California, Hawaii and Ohio. AC Transit has the largest fleet of hydrogen fuel cell buses in the United States, with 22 buses in service from Van Hool and New Flyer. This will allow a direct comparison between battery electric and hydrogen fuel cell buses, to guide future purchasing decisions in light of a desire for a zero emission bus fleet. AC Transit noted that they had the "most comprehensive zero-emission bus (ZEB) program in the United States", and had run  of service with zero emission buses since 2000.

In June 2021, the world's first hydrogen fuel cell double-decker bus (Wright StreetDeck Hydroliner) entered service with Metroline in London on route 7. These buses also entered service in Aberdeen, Scotland. The Hydroliner FCEV was developed as part of the European Union 'Joint Initiative for Hydrogen Vehicles across Europe' (JIVE).

Other bus manufacturers continued to enter the hydrogen fuel cell market, with Iveco announcing a memorandum of understanding with Air Liquide to develop 'hydrogen mobility', and Alexander Dennis announcing a 'next generation' double decker bus. New manufacturers also planned to enter the market, such as Hyzon Motors. Other countries continued to investigate the potential of hydrogen fuel cell buses, with Moscow announcing a pilot of Kamaz buses in 2022.

In May 2022, the public transport operator for Cologne, Germany ordered up to 100 hydrogen fuel cell buses from Solaris and WrightBus. This followed the announcement of the 'National Hydrogen Strategy' in Germany, which made clear that hydrogen fuel cell buses were a feasible alternative for long distance routes. Mercedes-Benz announced that their popular eCitaro bus would be made available with a range extender using a Toyota hydrogen fuel cell.

In July 2022, Île-de-France Mobilités (IDFM) ordered 47 fuel cell buses for the Grand Paris region in France at a cost of €48m. Green hydrogen will be used, with the hydrogen produced at an incinerator in Creteil. The managing director of IDFM stated that they wished to send a signal with their first order that bus manufacturers should "improve the technology, bring it to maturity, produce it [commercially] and we will be there".

In July 2022, over five hundred Foton AUV buses joined the Beijing Public Transport Group. Media reported that the buses have a range of around 600 km, and can be refilled in around 10 to 15 minutes. These buses had previously been used at the Beijing 2022 Winter Olympics.

In August 2022, India's first domestically developed hydrogen fuel bus was unveiled in Pune. The bus was developed by KPIT Technologies and the Council of Scientific and Industrial Research.

Comparison with battery electric buses 
Buses powered by hydrogen fuel cells have some similarities with battery electric buses, as well as key differences.

Both types are zero-emission at the tailpipe, with hydrogen fuel cell buses producing water. Both are propelled by electric motors, and both have been produced by a range of bus manufacturers. Both have upfront costs - such as electric chargers, or a hydrogen fuelling station.

Unlike battery electric buses, hydrogen fuel cell buses can be refuelled in around 10 minutes, compared to a overnight charge for electric buses (or an energy intensive, high current fast charge of a battery). Some manufacturers have used hydrogen fuel cells as a range extender for battery electric buses, allowing them to have greater range. Hydrogen also has a higher energy storage density of hydrogen than batteries. Furthermore, as batteries are made larger to increase range - they become heavier, decreasing energy efficiency.

Hydrogen fuel cell buses are less affected by temperature, with consistent power and range at extreme hot or cold temperatures. Operators of battery electric buses have reported shorter range in low temperatures, with Berliner Verkehrsbetriebe (BVG) reporting a 30% shorter range in cold weather (around ).

Costs of both battery electric buses and hydrogen fuel cell buses has fallen over time, with the cost of "fuelling" the buses with hydrogen or electricity being the key difference.

Costs

Hydrogen fuel 
The cost of fuelling buses has varied substantially, due to the cost and availability of hydrogen. Some transit operators have been able to use hydrogen by-product from industrial processes (such as the production of Polyvinyl chloride) to lower the cost. Other transit operators have built small scale plants to produce hydrogen from natural gas, or have purchased it directly from industrial producers.

In 2006, the National Renewable Energy Laboratory stated that the cost of hydrogen fuel was around $9 a kilogram, roughly comparing it to $2 a gallon for diesel. It further noted that the total cost per mile (including maintenance) was around $1 per mile for diesel and around $6.50 per mile for hydrogen. In Europe, the Clean Urban Transport for Europe (CUTE) project in the early 2000s reported fuelling costs around 10 times more than diesel.

In 2021,  reported that the cost of fuelling a hydrogen fuel cell bus is around 2.6 times higher than an equivalent diesel bus, with brown hydrogen predominately used in Japan.

In January 2022, the city of Montpellier, France, cancelled a contract to procure 51 buses powered by hydrogen fuel cells, when it found that "the cost of operation for hydrogen [buses] is 6 times the cost of electricity". The city ordered battery electric buses instead.

In 2021,  reported that their hydrogen fuel cell buses cost around the same as their diesel buses to operate. London reported that the cost of hydrogen was around £6 per kilogram in 2023, roughly comparable with the cost of diesel fuel. Projections from the Hydrogen Council are that hydrogen produced from renewable energy at scale could cost around $1.4 to $2.3 per kilogram.

Vehicles 
Costs of fuel cell buses has gradually fallen as technology has become more widespread and commercially viable.

In 2007, the National Renewable Energy Laboratory stated that the purchase price of a hydrogen fuel cell bus was around $2–3m, a standard diesel bus was around $330,000 and a hybrid bus was around $480,000.  in Cologne, Germany reported that the Phileas bus cost them €1.86m to purchase in 2011, a Van Hool A330 cost around €850,000 to purchase in 2014 and €590,000 to purchase in 2020, and that prices had fallen further - with new hydrogen fuel cell buses costing around €500,000 in 2023.

In 2022, the Financial Times reported that the Japanese Toyota FC Sora cost ¥100m (€710,000) for a six year lease, whereas a diesel bus costs around ¥24m (€17,000). Local authorities have subsidised the cost of the buses to get them into service.

In the United States, it was reported in 2022 that a hydrogen bus cost around $1.2m to purchase, compared to $750,000 for a battery electric bus. The Globe and Mail noted that European produced fuel cell buses are cheaper as they are produced in larger quantities.

Research groups such as H2Bus Consortium are working to lower the cost of hydrogen fuel cell buses to the level of diesel buses, with volume orders and mass production allowing manufacturers to take advantage of economies of scale.

Other costs 
When compared to diesel buses, transit operators face additional upfront costs when moving to hydrogen fuel cell buses. This includes constructing hydrogen fuelling stations, as well as purchasing spare parts for new buses. Battery electric buses have similar upfront costs, requiring the installation of electric chargers and upgrades to the electrical grid to handle large numbers of electric buses being charged (often overnight).

Vehicles 
, 5,648 hydrogen fuel cell buses are in use around the world, with 93.7% of them in China.

A wide variety of companies are currently producing hydrogen fuel cell buses. Bus manufacturers usually work with a provider of hydrogen fuel cells to power the bus, such as Ballard Power Systems or Toyota.

Vehicles include:

See also

 Fuel cell vehicle
 List of fuel cell vehicles
 List of buses

References

External links

H2mobility.org Hydrogen buses worldwide [Dead Link]
Toyota FCHV-BUS data sheet
International Fuel Cell Bus Collaborative [Dead Link]

Fuel cell buses
Energy technology